OKW is the Oberkommando der Wehrmacht, the high command of Nazi Germany's armed forces.

OKW may also refer to:

 "Old King William's", a label given to former school pupils, staff and governors of King William's College, Isle of Man
 Old Key West, a Disney resort in Florida, US
 One Kill Wonder, a 2003 album by the death/thrash-metal group The Haunted